Daphne E. Lee is a New Zealand geologist, palaeontologist and associate professor at the University of Otago. She is best known for her work on Foulden Maar and her research into fossils discovered at that site.

Biography 
Lee is an honorary associate professor at the geology department of the University of Otago. She is a coordinator of a research team that has focused on researching the fossil site Foulden Maar.

Foulden Maar 
Lee has published both scholarly research as well as a book on the fossils of Foulden Maar. Lee was a vocal opponent of the proposed mining of Foulden Maar.

Awards 
Lee was awarded the Geoscience Society of New Zealand McKay Hammer Award in 2017.

Selected publications

References 

Living people
New Zealand paleontologists
Women paleontologists
New Zealand women scientists
20th-century New Zealand scientists
21st-century New Zealand scientists
1950 births